Jason Wells may refer to:

 Jason Wells (cricketer) (born 1970), former New Zealand cricketer
 Jason Wells (playwright) (born 1960), American actor and playwright
 Jason Wells (rugby league) (born 1984), Australian rugby league player